Douglas J. Davis (born March 6, 1974) is an American music industry executive, entertainment lawyer and Grammy Award-winning record producer.

Early life 
Davis was born in New York City, the son of Clive Davis and Janet Adelberg Davis. Davis has three siblings: Fred, Lauren and Mitchell. He attended The Town School and the Dwight School in New York. Davis graduated from The Maxwell School of Citizenship and Public Affairs at Syracuse University with a degree in political science, and from Fordham University School of Law with a Juris Doctor.

Career 
Davis is the founder and managing partner of The Davis Firm, PLLC, a music, entertainment and sports law firm.

He is the executive producer of the annual Clive Davis pre-Grammy gala.  Davis produced original music for Disney, Netflix, WWE (under the pseudonym, "def rebel"), Nickelodeon and Paramount Pictures.
Davis was a licensed NBA player agent  who negotiated Metta World Peace's agreement with the New York Knicks. In 2015, Davis, along with Roger Gastman, co-curated Work In Progress, an art gallery and marketplace event in Los Angeles. In 2014–2015, Davis pursued the purchase of the NBA's Atlanta Hawks basketball team.

Davis served as a producer of American Dreamers: Voices of Hope, Music of Freedom by John Daversa Big Band Featuring 53 DACA recipients, which was released in September 2018. The project received bipartisan support through endorsements from Nancy Pelosi, Kamala Harris and Lindsey Graham. The album won three Grammys: Best Large Jazz Ensemble Album; Best Arrangement, Instrumental or A Cappella; and Best Improvised Jazz Solo. In 2019, Davis served as a producer of Shoulder to Shoulder: A Centennial Tribute to Women's Suffrage by The Karrin Allyson Sextet, and The Omni American Book Club by the Brian Lynch Big Band which won the 2019 Grammy Award for Best Large Jazz Ensemble Album. Davis served as executive producer of the Aretha Franklin memorial concert and TV special Aretha! A Grammy Celebration for the Queen of Soul, which aired on CBS.

In 2021, Davis produced New York's "We Love NYC: The Homecoming Concert" in Central Park’s Great Lawn for an estimated 60,000 people and global TV event broadcast by CNN in 200 countries and featured the performances of Andrea Bocelli, the New York Philharmonic, Jennifer Hudson, LL Cool J, Journey, Carlos Santana featuring Rob Thomas and others, which celebrated the city's emergence from the pandemic.

Philanthropy 
Davis sits on boards of the Clive Davis Institute of Recorded Music at New York University and Fuck Cancer. Davis serves on the entertainment committee for the annual Multiple Myeloma Research Foundation Gala and has chaired fundraising events for the Drug Policy Alliance and City of Hope National Medical Center.

Davis was a founding board member of the Forum on Law, Culture & Society, a position he held for ten years. In 2016, Billboard magazine named Davis to its list of top philanthropists in music.

Recognition
Davis appeared in Jeff Rabhan's book "Cool Jobs In The Music Business".  In 2012 The Hollywood Reporter called Davis's Twitter (@DJD) one of the "Top 5 Music Power" accounts.

Since 2016, Billboard magazine has annually listed Davis one of the "top power lawyers" in music, since 2017 Best Lawyers in America has recognized Davis for Entertainment Law – Music. Since 2018 Variety has named Davis in its Legal Impact issue  
and in 2019 Davis was profiled by Super Lawyers for Entertainment & Sports.

In 2018, Variety named Davis Lawyer of the Year at its annual Power Of Law event. In 2020, the UJA-Federation of New York named Davis its "Music Visionary of the Year."

Personal life
Davis lives in New York City with stylist wife Jessie Davis and their daughters Billie and Cody in a townhouse originally built for Clement Clarke Moore. In 2007, during an emergency appendectomy, Davis was found to have a carcinoid tumor. Davis described the moment as one of dumb luck which could have led to a terminal condition that became an awakening and the impetus for his philanthropic work.

References

External links 

Grammy Award winners
1974 births
A&R people
American music industry executives
American entertainment lawyers
Jewish American attorneys
Living people
Philanthropists from New York (state)
Businesspeople from New York City
Record producers from New York (state)
People from New York City
Maxwell School of Citizenship and Public Affairs alumni
Fordham University School of Law alumni
21st-century American Jews